William Glynne-Jones (1907–1977) was a Welsh fiction and children's writer, broadcaster and journalist. His stories were broadcast weekly on BBC Children's Hour.

Early life and career
He was born and brought up in Llanelli and went to Llanelli Boys' County School. His love of literature and his childhood desire to be a writer was fed by the books read in Llanelli library.

Glynne-Jones worked between the ages of 16 and 36 as a steel-foundry moulder at Glanmor Foundry. He would then type his writings in the evening. He was a fluent Welsh speaker, but suffered from a cleft palate and hare lip. He was released from the foundry on medical grounds in 1943. While his wife and son remained initially in Wales, he went to London to pursue an ambition to earn his living as a freelance writer and novelist.

His stories for children and adults were broadcast weekly on Children's Hour and regularly on the mid-morning story hour by the BBC. His full name of William Glynne-Jones was necessary to distinguish him from other writers with similar names.

Writings and writers
Glynne-Jones wrote with fidelity and feeling about many aspects of life in industrial South Wales in the 1920s, notably the steel foundries and the Llanelli area. He addressed those who lived there and outsiders.

His circle of literary friends, acquaintances, and correspondents included: Glyn Jones, Doris Lessing, W. Somerset Maugham, George Ewart Evans, Gareth Hughes (a first cousin), Gwyn Jones, Gwyn Thomas, Dylan Thomas, Brian Forbes, Emyr Humphreys, Clifford Evans, Emlyn Williams and Richard Burton.

Bibliography
Glynne-Jones's published work includes four major novels, 12 books for children, Welsh short story collections and school readers for children. A full list of his published work appears here, but more remains in manuscript.

Novels

Short stories
Welsh Stories. He Who had Eaten of the Eagle (William Maclellan, 1948)

Children's books

School readers
The Golden Boy (Blackie & Son, 1951 – Kingfisher Books Third Series) 
If Pigs Had Wings (Blackie & Son 1954 – Kingfisher Books Third Series)	
The Buccaneers (Thomas Nelson – Nelson's Speedwell Readers)
Yukon Gold (Tomas Nelson – Nelson's Speedwell Readers)

Magazine contributions

Awards and recognition
Glynne-Jones was awarded a £300 "Atlantic Award" for literature by the Rockefeller Foundation in 1946. He received medals from the University of Southern Mississippi in 1970, 1976 and 1979 for contributions to children's literature. He is also represented in the De Grummond Children's Literature Collection. His name appears on the January 1982 National Geographic map of Novelists of the British Isles. He also features in the Oxford Companion to the Literature of Wales and Author and Writers Who's Who.

In December 2015, a commemorative panel to Glynne-Jones was placed in the foyer of Llanelli Library, honouring his work as an author.

References

External sources
 (A short biography by his son and daughter in law)
Llanelli Miscellany 2014, 2015, 2016, 2017, 2018 and 2019

1907 births
1977 deaths
20th-century Welsh writers
People from Llanelli